William Fanaghan Lynch (20 November 1892 – 10 April 1923) was an officer in the Irish Republican Army during the Irish War of Independence of 1919-1921. During much of the Irish Civil War, he was chief of staff of the Irish Republican Army. On 10 April 1923, Lynch was killed whilst trying to escape an encirclement by Free State troops in south Tipperary.

Early life
Lynch was born in the townland of Baurnagurrahy, Anglesboro, County Limerick, near Mitchelstown, County Cork, on 20 November 1892. His father was Jeremiah Lynch and his mother was Mary Lynch (née Kelly), both of whom are buried in Brigown graveyard, Mitchelstown. During his first twelve years of schooling he attended Anglesboro National School. Lynch was living with his parents in Baurnagurrahy for the 1901 and 1911 censuses.

In 1909, at the age of 17, he started an apprenticeship in O'Neill's hardware shop in Mitchelstown, where he joined the Gaelic League and the Ancient Order of Hibernians. Later he worked at Barry's Timber Yard in Fermoy. In the aftermath of the 1916 Easter Rising, he witnessed David and Thomas Kent of Bawnard House being taken through Fermoy after their arrest by the Royal Irish Constabulary. After this, he determined to dedicate his life to Irish republicanism. In 1917 he was elected First Lieutenant of the Irish Volunteer Company, based in Fermoy.

War of Independence

In Cork, Lynch reorganised the Irish Volunteers—the paramilitary organisation that became the Irish Republican Army (IRA)—in 1919, becoming commandant of the Cork No. 2 Brigade of the IRA during the guerrilla Anglo-Irish War. He helped capture a senior British officer, General Cuthbert Lucas, in June 1920, shooting a Colonel Danford in the incident. Lucas later escaped while being held by IRA men in County Clare. Lynch was captured, together with the other officers of the Cork No. 2 Brigade, in a British raid on Cork City Hall in August 1920.

Terence McSwiney, Lord Mayor of Cork, was among those captured; he later died on hunger strike in protest at his detention. Lynch, however, gave a false name and was released three days later. He then began to organise a flying column within his IRA brigade to launch attacks on British targets. Having "made himself a leader out of force of his own convictions ... possessed by a sense of mission and by revolutionary ardour", Lynch believed independence could only be "hewed" by the British.

In September 1920, Lynch, along with Ernie O'Malley, commanded a force that took the British Army barracks at Mallow. The arms in the barracks were seized and the building partially burnt. Before the end of 1920, Lynch's brigade had successfully ambushed British troops on two other occasions. Lynch's guerrilla campaign continued into early 1921, with some successes such as the ambush and killing of 13 British soldiers near Millstreet.

In March-April 1921, the IRA was reorganised into divisions based on regions. Lynch's reputation was such that he was made commander of the 1st Southern Division. Ernie O'Malley brought that news from GHQ on 21 April. From April 1921 until the Truce that ended the war in July 1921, Lynch's command was put under increasing pressure by the deployment of more British troops into the area and the British use of small mobile units to counter IRA guerrilla tactics. Lynch was no longer in command of the Cork No. 2 Brigade, for he had to travel in secret to each of the nine IRA Brigades in Munster. By the time of the Truce, the IRA under Liam Lynch was increasingly hard-pressed and short of arms and ammunition. He, therefore, welcomed the Truce as a respite but expected the war to continue after it ended.

Civil War

The War of Independence ended formally with the signing of the Anglo-Irish Treaty between the Irish negotiating team and the British government in December 1921. Lynch was opposed to the Treaty, on the grounds that it disestablished the Irish Republic proclaimed in 1916 in favour of Dominion status for Ireland within the British Empire.

Lynch, however, did not want a split in the republican movement and hoped to reach a compromise with those who supported the Treaty ("Free Staters") by the publication of a republican constitution for the new Irish Free State. But the British would not accept this, as the Treaty had only just been signed and ratified, leading to a deeper split in IRA ranks. Lynch did his best to reunite a divided IRA and continued to hold discussions with the opposing side for a number of months. Both he and Michael Collins were on the IRB Supreme Council and neither wanted to see a civil war.

Lynch, who commanded by far the largest area of any divisional commander, was elected temporary chief of staff by the Republican Military Council in March. His appointment as chief of staff of the anti-treaty forces was confirmed on 9 April by the Executive appointed at the army convention of 26 March.

He did not participate in the seizure of the Four Courts in Dublin by a group of hardline republicans in April 1922. However, at the Third Army Convention on 18 June, following the defeat of a proposal he opposed — to restart hostilities with the British — a diehard faction broke away from his leadership and set up a new GHQ at the Four Courts. Lynch remained recognised as IRA chief of staff by a majority of republicans.

This rift had been healed by the time the Four Courts garrison was attacked by the newly formed National Army on 28 June, which marked the beginning of the Irish Civil War. On 27 June, Lynch and Liam Deasy had met with McKelvey and Mellows in the Four Courts. The result was a reunification of the two IRA groupings with Lynch as chief of staff.

On 28 June, Free State forces arrested his party, including Deasy, but Free State general Eoin O'Duffy allowed them to leave the city. Later it was stopped by a Free State patrol in County Kilkenny and spent some time with enemy officers. A Free State publication stated that Lynch had been released on the understanding that he disavowed the approach of the 'Irregulars'. O'Duffy was adamant that Lynch had assured him that he would not take up arms against the government. For his part, Lynch issued a vehement denial of any such undertaking having been given, in which regard he was supported by Florrie O'Donoghue and Deasy.

Lynch now began organising resistance elsewhere. On 1 July 1922 IRA forces occupied portions of Limerick city. At this time Lynch also sent a note to the leader of the Free State forces to discuss the possibility of a truce.

Lynch wished to establish a "Munster Republic", which he believed would frustrate the creation of the Free State. This "Munster Republic" would be defended by the "Waterford-Limerick Line". From south-east to north-west, this consisted of the city of Waterford, the towns of Carrick-on-Suir, Clonmel, Fethard, Cashel, Golden, and Tipperary, and ended at the city of Limerick, where Lynch established his headquarters. He led Limerick's defence, but it fell to Free State troops on 20 July 1922.

He retreated further south and set up his new headquarters at Fermoy. The "Munster Republic" collapsed in August, when Free State troops landed by sea in Cork and Kerry. Cork City was taken on 8 August and Lynch abandoned Fermoy the next day. The Anti-Treaty forces then dispersed and pursued guerrilla tactics. His counterpart Michael Collins was killed in an ambush at Béal na mBláth, Cork on 22 August, a week after the death of Arthur Griffith.

Lynch contributed to the growing bitterness of the war by issuing what were known as the "orders of frightfulness" against the Provisional Government on 30 November 1922. This general order sanctioned the killing of Free State TDs (members of parliament) and senators, as well as certain judges and newspaper editors, in reprisal for the Free State's killing of captured republicans. The first republican prisoners to be put to death were four captured IRA men on 14 November 1922, followed by the execution of republican leader Erskine Childers on 17 November.

These orders were acted upon by IRA men, who killed TD Sean Hales and wounded another TD outside the Dáil on 7 December 1922. In response, the Free State shot four republican leaders, Rory O'Connor, Liam Mellows, Dick Barrett and Joe McKelvey the next day. This led to a cycle of atrocities on both sides, including the Free State official execution of 77 republican prisoners and "unofficial" killing of roughly 150 other captured republicans. Lynch's men, for their part, launched a concerted campaign against the homes of Free State members of parliament.

Among the acts they carried out were the burning of the house of TD Seán McGarry, resulting in the death of his seven-year-old son, the murder of Free State minister Kevin O'Higgins' elderly father and the burning of the O'Higgins' family homestead at Stradbally in early 1923. Lynch wrote to Éamon de Valera that "Free State supporters are traitors and deserve the latter's stark fate".

Lynch was heavily criticised by some republicans, notably O'Malley, for his failure to coordinate their war effort and for letting the conflict peter out into inconclusive and defensive guerrilla warfare. Other IRA volunteers felt that while Lynch was a decent man, he had failed to organise and lead the anti-treaty forces properly and did not possess the mind-set of a revolutionary to strike early for a swift victory.

Lynch was scathing of the Dáil and the old IRA GHQ for having abandoned the people in the North, "particularly in Belfast".

In March 1923, the Anti-Treaty IRA Army Executive met in a remote location in the Nire Valley. Several members of the executive proposed ending the civil war; however, Lynch opposed them and narrowly carried a 6–5 vote to continue the war. He had been trying to import mountain artillery from Germany in a vain attempt to turn the tide of the war. When killed, he was carrying documents that appeared to call for the end of the war.

Death

On 10 April 1923, a National Army unit was seen approaching Lynch's secret headquarters in the Knockmealdown Mountains. Lynch was in possession of important papers that he knew had to not fall into enemy hands, so he and his six comrades attempted to evade them. To their shock, they ran into another unit of 50 National Army soldiers approaching from the opposite direction. Lynch was shortly afterwards hit by rifle fire from the road at the foot of the hill. Knowing the value of the papers they carried, he ordered his men, including soon-to-be chief of staff Frank Aiken, to leave him behind. When the National Army soldiers reached Lynch they initially believed him to be Éamon de Valera, but he informed them – "I am Liam Lynch, Chief-of-Staff of the Irish Republican Army. Get me a priest and doctor. I'm dying." His last wish was to be buried next to his comrade, Michael Fitzgerald. In late 1920, Fitzgerald had died after a 67-day hunger strike. Lynch was carried on an improvised stretcher manufactured from guns to "Nugent's" pub in Newcastle at the foot of the mountains and was later brought to the hospital in Clonmel, where he died that evening at 8 pm. He was buried two days later at Kilcrumper Cemetery, near Fermoy, County Cork.

Legacy
According to historian Tom Mahon, the Irish Civil War was "effectively ended" by the shot that killed Liam Lynch. Twenty days later, his successor, Frank Aiken, gave the order to cease military operations.

On 7 April 1935, 12 years later, the Fianna Fáil Government of Éamon de Valera erected a  round tower monument on the spot where Lynch was thought to have fallen in the Knockmealdown Mountains. The Irish Defence Forces barracks at Kilworth, County Cork, is named Camp Ó Loingsigh after Liam Lynch.

The bloodied tunic worn by Lynch on the day he was shot is on permanent display at the National Museum at Collins Barracks in Dublin. The Good Friday Agreement, which ended The Troubles in Northern Ireland, was signed on 10 April 1998, the 75th anniversary of Lynch's death.

References

Sources
 Hopkinson, M., Green against Green, the Irish Civil War (Dublin, 1988)
 Walsh, P.V., The Irish Civil War 1922–23 – A Study of the Conventional Phase 
 Ryan, Meda, The Real Chief: The Story of Liam Lynch (Cork, 1986)
 O'Donoghue, Florence, No Other Law: The Story of Liam Lynch and the Irish Republican Army, 1916–1923 (Dublin, 1954 and 1986)
 O'Farrell, P., Who's Who in the Irish War of Independence & Civil War 
 Borgonovo, J., The Battle for Cork, July–August 1922

External links
Letters of Liam Lynch
Liam Lynch Dead
The Irish War
Liam Lynch (Liam ui Loinsigh) 
Irish Republican Brotherhood
Liam Lynch: Victim of the Irish Civil War

1892 births
1923 deaths
Irish generals
Irish Republican Army (1919–1922) members
Irish Republican Army (1922–1969) members
People of the Irish Civil War (Anti-Treaty side)
Military personnel from County Limerick
Deaths by firearm in Ireland